Willie Hall may refer to:
 Willie Hall (pianist) (died 1930), nicknamed "Drive'em Down", American keyboardist
 Willie Hall (drummer) (born 1950), American drummer
 Willie Hall (American football) (born 1949), American football player
 Willie Hall (English footballer) (1912–1967), Tottenham Hotspur and England international footballer
 Will Hall (born 1966), mental health advocate, writer, and counselor

See also
 Willis Hall, English playwright 
 Wilbur Hall (musician), US trombonist, violinist, and vaudevillian
 Willard Hall, Delaware politician
 Willard Preble Hall, former provisional governor of Missouri 
William Hall (disambiguation)